Chevy SS may refer to:

 Chevrolet SS (concept car), introduced in 2003 but never approved for production
 Holden Commodore (VF), a sedan sold in the United States as the Chevrolet SS from 2013 until 2017
 Super Sport (Chevrolet), a signature performance option package offered by Chevrolet since 1961

See also
 Chevrolet SSR, a pickup truck manufactured by Chevrolet between 2003 and 2006